Capillaria (1921) is a fantasy novel by Hungarian author Frigyes Karinthy,  which depicts an undersea world inhabited exclusively by women, recounts, in a satirical vein reminiscent of the style of Jonathan Swift, the first time that men and women experience sex with one another.

Expressing a pessimistic view of women, the novel suggests that, with disastrous effect, women, who are emotional and illogical, dominate men, the creative, rational force within humanity, who represent the builders of civilization.

The males, known as bullpops, are of small stature. They spend their time building and rebuilding tall, complex, rather phallic towers that the gigantic women destroy as quickly as these structures are erected. Meanwhile, the females engage in sexual adventures, surviving by eating the brains of the miniature men, who have become little more than personified male genitals.

The undersea kingdom is mentioned in the comic book version of The League of Extraordinary Gentlemen.

A readily available summary of the relatively rare novel's plot is provided in The Dictionary of Imaginary Places.

Adaptations

A radio dramatisation of Capillaria titled Voyage to Capiilaria was transmitted on BBC Radio 3 on 17 February 1976. It was adapted for radio by George Mikes, and produced and directed by Martin Esslin. It featured the voices of John Rowe as Gulliver, Jane Wenham as the Queen of Capillaria, plus Norma Ronald, Garard Green, and others.

Related works
Capillaria is the sequel to Karinthy's 1916 novel, Voyage to Faremido, in which the protagonist is transported from the battlefields of World War I to Faremido, where he encounters men of steel with musical voices and brains composed of a "mixture of quicksilver and minerals." The two works are presented by the author as the fifth and sixth journeys of Gulliver.

Some publishers have released the two works in a combined volume, one German edition using the title The New Travels of Lemuel Gulliver. However, the novels have little in common; Voyage to Faremido is an example of utopian literature, while the main topic of Capillaria is the coexistence of men and women.

See also
 Voyage to Faremido
 Kazohinia

References

Sources

External links
Karinthy Frigyes, Capillária.  (complete text online)
Frederiko Karinthy, Vojaĝo al Faremido, Kapilario, tradukis: Lajos Tarkony, Hungara Esperanto-Asocio, Budapest, 1980.  (complete text online through Wayback engine at archive.org)
 Frigyes Karnithy timeline from the Frankfurt '99 Non-profit Organisation
 
 

1921 novels
Hungarian novels
Fantasy novels
Underwater civilizations in fiction
Underwater novels